Carlo Mazzacurati (2 March 1956 – 22 January 2014) was an Italian film director and screenwriter born in Padua. He started his cinema career in 1980.

His better known films include  Il Toro (1994) and La lingua del santo (2000). He was educated and graduated from University of Bologna.

Mazzacurati died in Padua. He was an atheist. He was married to Marina Zangirolami until his death.

Partial filmography

Director
 Notte italiana (1987)
 Il prete bello (1989)
 Un'altra vita (1992)
 Il toro (1994)
 L'estate di Davide (1998)
 La lingua del santo (2000)
  (2002)
 An Italian Romance (L'amore ritrovato) (2004)
 La giusta distanza (2007)
 La passione (2010)
 Medici con l'Africa (2012)
  (2013)

Screenwriter
 Marrakesh Express (1989)

References

External links

1956 births
2014 deaths
Film people from Padua
Italian film directors
Nastro d'Argento winners
Ciak d'oro winners